Aeolus is a genus of click beetles in the family Elateridae. There are more than 220 described species in Aeolus, found throughout the world.

See also
 List of Aeolus species

References

Further reading

External links

 

Elateridae